Lab Sefid-e Olya (also Romanized as Lab Sefīd-e ‘Olyā; also known as Lop Sefīd-e ‘Olyā) is a village in Sardasht Rural District, Sardasht District, Dezful County, Khuzestan Province, Iran. At the 2006 census, its population was 166, in 35 families.

References 

Populated places in Dezful County